The Quin Building is an historic structure located at 500 4th Avenue in San Diego's Gaslamp Quarter, in the U.S. state of California. It was built in 1930.

See also
 List of Gaslamp Quarter historic buildings

References

External links

 

1930 establishments in California
Buildings and structures completed in 1930
Buildings and structures in San Diego
Gaslamp Quarter, San Diego